Tristetraprolin (TTP), also known as zinc finger protein 36 homolog (ZFP36), is a protein that in humans, mice and rats is encoded by the ZFP36 gene. It is a member of the TIS11 (TPA-induced sequence) family, along with butyrate response factors 1 and 2.

TTP binds to AU-rich elements (AREs) in the 3'-untranslated regions (UTRs) of the mRNAs of some cytokines and promotes their degradation. For example, TTP is a component of a negative feedback loop that interferes with TNF-alpha production by destabilizing its mRNA.  Mice deficient in TTP develop a complex syndrome of inflammatory diseases.

Interactions
ZFP36 has been shown to interact with 14-3-3 protein family members, such as YWHAH, and with NUP214, a member of the nuclear pore complex.

Regulation
Post-transcriptionally, TTP is regulated in several ways. The subcellular localization of TTP is influenced by interactions with protein partners such as the 14-3-3 family of proteins. These interactions and, possibly, interactions with target mRNAs are affected by the phosphorylation state of TTP, as the protein can be posttranslationally modified by a large number of protein kinases. There is some evidence that the TTP transcript may also be targeted by microRNAs, such as miR-29a.

References

Further reading